Ibrahim Al-Buleihi (or Albleahy) (Arabic: ابراهيم البليهي) is a Saudi liberal writer and philosopher, who is currently a member of the Saudi Shura Council.

Biography 
Albleahy has held a range of positions in government and business throughout his life. Aside from his position on the Shura Council, he is involved in a variety of organizations in Saudi civil society. While he is a devout Muslim, he is highly critical of the way Islam is publicly practised and the degree to which modern Muslim societies are governed by it.

The central concern of his writings is the relative decline of Arab and Islamic civilization, compared to the other civilizations of the world. From his studies he has concluded that Western Civilization has several deep cultural principles that make it more dynamic and more open-minded, and therefore able to develop faster, through empowering individuality and independent thinking. These principles developed in the West over centuries, beginning in Ancient Greek philosophy and gaining power in the Age of Enlightenment.

He concluded that other (non-Western) cultures, such as Japan, China and Israel were able to advance to a high level of development and freedom only by taking and incorporating these crucial principles from the West. By incorporating these principles in their culture, countries such as Japan managed to actually invigorate their culture and prevent it from stagnating, while simultaneously matching the West in power, freedom and standard of living.

He blames the failure of Arab societies to develop and innovate on their refusal to learn from other civilizations or to criticize the principles of their own society. He advocates the incorporation of modern Science and critical thinking in the heart of Arab culture, as it was in Japan. Thus while Arab public society would develop along free, modern and self-critical lines, the heritage of Islam would still provide the spiritual backbone of Arab civilization.

His concern with the decline of the condition of the Arabs has led him to conclude that "... the situation in Saudi Arabia is sad and shameful, so it is clearly necessary not only to be concerned but to be deeply anxious.  I learned early in my life that a dreadful flaw afflicts the lives of others, but at first I did not understand the reasons.  My deep anxiety impelled me to study our history and culture in depth in search of the source of the flaw, and also led me to devote attention to the triumphant Western civilization, beginning with Greek philosophical thought, continuing through the political, social, scientific, anthropological and other achievements of the West.  I became convinced that Western civilization is exceptional and pioneering, and is not an extension of the previous civilizations:  it is civilization par excellence.  The excellence of the West lies not in its accomplishments in the sciences, arts and technology, but rather, these accomplishments are the outgrowth of the West's respect for profit, the free system, its liberty, and the establishment of government in the service of the people—the government belongs to the people, and they do not belong to it as like in all other countries of the world.  This is a qualitative change, unprecedented in human history, and the source of everything that the human being experiences of the amazing changes in all aspects of life."

He has written a book titled The Qualitative Changes in Human Civilization.

The "Young Saudi Artists Exhibition" of 2009 was presented under his auspices.

Notes
 elaph.com
 For more on Ibrahim Al-Buleihi, see MEMRI TV Clip No. 1174, "Saudi Shura Council member Ibrahim Albleahy: Terrorism Is the Product of a Flaw in Arab and Muslim Culture", May 23, 2006
 MEMRI TV Clip No. 638, "#638 - Saudi Liberal: America's Actions are Natural for a Country That Was Attacked. If an Islamic Country Was Attacked its Response Would Be Worse", April 6, 2005

Books
 The Qualitative Changes in Human Civilization

References

External links

Intellectual biography from Aafaq.
Interview from April 23, 2009 Saudi Daily 'Okaz.
Youtube video "Arabs Have Nothing to Offer Others".
Youtube video: "Saudi Official: Terrorism Is the Product of a Flaw". 
Youtube video: "A Product of 'Our' Tyrannical Culture".
Youtube video: "America has the excuse what they do".

Ibrahim
Ibrahim
1944 births
Critics of Islamism
Living people
People from Buraidah
Saudi Arabian Sunni Muslims
Saudi Arabian writers